The Austrian Military Merit Decoration was established 13 November 1989 to honor the Military of Austria.  The badge is a silver-gilt breast star which is worn on the left chest.  The cross is 60 mm wide and high and in white enamel, with a red border.  In the center is a gold medallion with the Austrian eagle.  The cross has no inscription on the obverse, but on the reverse is inscribed Verdienst (Military Merit).  Between the arms of the cross are gold crossed swords.

See also
Honours system in the Republic of Austria

References

Military awards and decorations of Austria